Tulla (Bella) Blomberg Ranslet (born 15 May 1928, Oslo, Norway) is a Norwegian painter and sculptor.

Biography
Ranslet (née Blomberg) attended Issac Grünewald school in Stockholm in 1946 and later studied in the Norwegian National Academy of Fine Arts under Prof. Per Krogh.
Her first artistic appearance was with a wandering exhibition of Unge Kunstneres Samfund (U.K.S) in 1950. She was accepted to the Royal Danish Academy of Fine Arts the following year, where she met ceramist and sculptor Arne Ranslet. The two married in 1955 and moved to Bornholm where they had their three children – painter Pia Ranslet, sculptor Paul Ranslet and pilot Charlotte Pedersen.

Ranslet made her first appearance on the island in 1965, when her relief was exhibited at the local museum alongside the works of other artists. The artifact immediately caught the eye of the press and was sold soon later in Sweden.
Following were numerous exhibitions in Norway and Sweden, as well as Tulla's winning of several prizes in contests initiated by Oslo's municipality – choosing her to decorate the new children's section of Oslo's public library and two schools in Norway.

Her works were also chosen to decorate schools and hospitals in Denmark, Sweden and (Germany), and an evangelical church in north Germany.
Tulla soon after started providing Skanska, a leading Swedish building company, with concrete reliefs used in building projects all over Europe.

She resumed painting in the 80s, combining motives from her surroundings – children, animals and life at the countryside – on very large canvases.  She also found the inspiration for several of her reliefs and paintings in the circus world. She exhibited several times, mostly with her husband, in the next years, and received G.I. (Guarantee Income) from the Norwegian government in 1991. The couple moved to Spain where Tulla has a painting studio.

Works

Notable works
A great deal of Tulla's work has been purchased by municipalities and placed in public institutions such as:

Large works
 
 Noas Ark – Stoneware relief (1965).
 Eventyrbyen – Stoneware relief (1972).
 Arne – Acryl on canvas.
 Røde Heste – Acryl on canvas (1984).
 Bortførelsen – Acryl on canvas (2000).

Other selected works
 Ymers øje – Stoneware relief (1968)
 Jerikos Mure – Stoneware relief (1966)
 Cirkusheste – Stoneware relief (1978)
 Orkester  – Stoneware relief (1980)
 Musik klovn – Stoneware sculpture (1983)
 De blå heste – Acryl on canvas (1984)

Exhibitions

Selected solo exhibitions

Conjoined Exhibitions

Notes

References

External links
 Tulla Ranslet’s homepage
 Tulla Ranslet, Weilbach Art Lexicon

1928 births
Living people
Artists from Oslo
20th-century Norwegian painters
21st-century Norwegian painters
Norwegian contemporary artists
Royal Danish Academy of Fine Arts alumni
Norwegian women painters
20th-century Norwegian women artists
21st-century Norwegian women artists